Bangihlombe Kobese (born 19 January 1992) is a South African rugby union player, currently playing with the . His regular position is scrum-half.

Career

Youth and Varsity rugby

Kobese represented his local province, Border, at various youth tournaments – in 2005, he played for them at the Under-13 Craven Week competition and in 2008, he played at the Under-16 Grant Khomo Week, which led to his inclusion in a South African Under-16 Elite squad. After a solid performance at the 2009 Under-18 Craven Week tournament, Kobese was included in the South African Schools squad that played against their Italian counterparts.

Kobese also played in yet another Craven Week tournament in 2010 and was also included in the  team that participated in the 2010 Under-19 Provincial Championship, making a solitary appearance. He also continued to play for (and captain) school side Dale College until 2011.

In 2013, Kobese moved to Port Elizabeth where he joined the  academy. He made one appearance in the  side's title-winning 2013 Under-21 Provincial Championship season and was an unused substitute in their promotion/relegation match against former side .

The following season, Kobese joined Alice-based university side  in their 2014 Varsity Shield campaign. He made six starts and two substitute appearances as they narrowly lost out on a spot in the final of the competition, contributing eleven points with the boot.

Border Bulldogs

Following on from his performance in the 2014 Varsity Shield, Kobese was included in the ' squad for the last three matches of their 2014 Vodacom Cup campaign.

References

1992 births
Living people
People from Mdantsane
South African rugby union players
Border Bulldogs players
Rugby union scrum-halves
Rugby union players from the Eastern Cape